Invitation to the Dance is the debut major label studio album by the American metal band 40 Below Summer. The album was released on October 16, 2001 via London-Sire Records. Two months after its release, the label went out of business, and the album was re-issued through Warner Music.

Background
Formed in 1998, 40 Below Summer had made a name for themselves by performing heavily across their native New Jersey and New York. In late 2000, the band's self-released CD Side Show Freaks found its way to No Name Management (known for acts such as Slipknot and Mudvayne). After partnering with No Name, numerous record label showcases on both coasts followed, with up to fifteen prominent labels showing interest in the band. They eventually signed with Warner Music Group's London-Sire. In March 2001, 40 Below Summer travelled to Los Angeles to commence recording their major label debut with famed heavy metal producer GGGarth (Rage Against the Machine, Mudvayne, Kittie). Lead guitarist Jordan Plingos recalled "I think the first thing that we clicked with Garth about was that he was relaxed. He wasn't like, 'let's go, guys, let's go!' He was more like, 'get comfortable, get settled in.' His whole thing is bringing out the best in you, so pressuring you to do something doesn't help. He was all about us, which was amazing", while vocalist Max Illidge said "He’s a lot of fun. He’s crazy too. Definitely a crazy little fucker, but he’s a lot of fun and a very talented guy. He definitely helped unlock some doors inside of me."

Promotion and artwork
No conceptual music videos ended up being made to promote Invitation to the Dance, in part due to issues with the band's troubled label London-Sire. Despite being one of the heavier songs on the album, "Falling Down" received moderate airplay, leading to it initially being considered. Max Illidge stated in 2002 "We could have made a video for it and maybe if the video was shocking enough it would have given us a bigger push, but London-Sire just decided to scrap "Falling Down" and go with "Wither Away" for the video. I mean we were literally going to leave in like a few days to shoot the video for ‘Wither Away" — en route to LA — we had the plane tickets and the actresses schedules and just all that, and we were about three days away from the day of shooting and we got the phone call that we weren’t doing it and they were going to wait until early next year, but we knew that they were folding. We are not ever going to get that video."

The elderly man on the album cover also appeared in the 2000 music video for the 3 Doors Down song "Kryptonite." The artwork concept was conceived by the band members and created by Los Angeles-based t42design.

Music
The album combines the downtuned riffs of nu metal/alternative metal with elements of New Jersey hardcore, hip hop, jazz and hard rock. Regarding the album's sound, rhythm guitarist Joey D'Amico remarked in September 2001 that "the music is definitely emotional, but its hardcore in its roots". Songs such as "Falling Down" and "Rejection" feature a volatile brand of singing which frequently alternates between melodic crooning, rapping and more extreme vocal stylings. Jordan Plingos stated "If somebody asks me what this band sounds like, I say 'go listen to 'Falling Down,' because it has everything. It starts off fast and heavy and brutal, and then, from the bridge and chorus to the end, it makes you cry. That song right there covers it all."

"Step into the Sideshow", "Falling Down", "Rejection" and "Jonesin" were all rerecorded songs that originally appeared on the band's independent releases Side Show Freaks and Rain. D'Amico stated "'Falling Down' is like the epitome of 40 Below Summer. There was no way that it wasn't going to make the album. 'Jonesin' is a sick twisted tale that we just wanted to tell. It's a true story. 'Sideshow' is like the anthem. It always gets the crowd going. 'Rejection'… I don't know. It's just a pretty heavy song so it made it." The song "Power Tool" was one of the earliest pieces of music written by the band. It was originally titled "Monica" (in reference to the Monica Lewinsky and Bill Clinton scandal) but had to be changed for legal reasons.

Reception
Allmusic's Jason D. Taylor gave the album a positive four-star review, noting that "Invitation to the Dance at first glance may seem to be just another hard rock album, but along with further observation it is apparent that 40 Below Summer is striving to spice up what modern hard rock became in the 21st century." He concluded his review by writing "40 Below Summer's ability to keep the listener guessing and the album's repetitive appeal make Invitation to the Dance a surefire hit for those looking for something more out of hard rock than a down-tuned bass and simplistic lyrics." In 2015, VH1 ranked the album ninth on their list of "The 12 Most Underrated Nu Metal Albums".

According to Max Illidge, the record has sold roughly 100,000 copies. He has also noted it is the only record 40 Below Summer do not control the rights to.

Track listing

Personnel

40 Below Summer
 Max Illidge – vocals
 Joey D'Amico – guitar
 Jordan Plingos – guitar
 Hector Graziani – bass
 Carlos Aguilar – drums, piano

Production
 Producer – GGGarth, M. Shawn Crahan, Steve Richards
 Engineer – Michael Baskette
 Mixing – Toby Wright at the Record Plant
 A&R – Adrian Vallera
 Second Engineer at Cello Studios – Alan Sanderson
 Second Engineer at Sound City Studios – Ben Mumphrey
 Production Coordinator – Chris Vaughan-Jones
 Digital Editing – Ben Kapplan
 Mastering – Alan Silverman at Arf! Digital NYC
 Photography – Dean Karr, M. Shawn Crahan, Stefan Seskis
 album art – t42design

References

2001 albums
Sire Records albums
Reprise Records albums
Warner Records albums
40 Below Summer albums
Albums produced by Garth Richardson
Albums recorded at Sound City Studios